Miloš Babić (Serbian Cyrillic: Милош Бабић; born November 23, 1968) is a Serbian former professional basketball player. He is a 7'0" 240 lb power forward/center.

He played collegiate basketball for the Tennessee Technological University in Cookeville, Tennessee for 3 seasons (1987/88-1989/90). He was selected by the Phoenix Suns in the second round (50th pick overall) of the 1990 NBA draft, and immediately on the draft day traded to the Cleveland Cavaliers in exchange for the Italian player Stefano Rusconi (drafted with the 52nd pick overall by Cavaliers).

He played in the National Basketball Association (NBA) for two seasons for the Cleveland Cavaliers (1990–91) and Miami Heat (1991–92), all together in 21 games, averaging 1.8 points and 1.0 rebounds per game in 4.1 minutes per game on average.

NBA career statistics

Regular season 

|-
| style="text-align:left;"| 
| style="text-align:left;"|Cleveland
| 12 || 0 || 4.3 || .316 || – || .583 || 0.8 || 0.3 || 0.1 || 0.1 || 1.6
|-
| style="text-align:left;"| 
| style="text-align:left;"|Miami
| 9 || 0 || 3.9 || .462 || – || .750 || 1.2 || 0.7 || 0.1 || 0.0 || 2.0
|- class="sortbottom"
| style="text-align:center;" colspan="2"| Career
| 21 || 0 || 4.1 || .375 || – || .650 || 1.0 || 0.5 || 0.1 || 0.0 || 1.8

See also 
 List of Serbian NBA players

External links

Miloš Babić player profile @ acb.com

1968 births
Living people
AEK B.C. players
Antwerp Giants players
Baloncesto Fuenlabrada players
Basket Zielona Góra players
BC Prievidza players
BC Žalgiris players
CAB Madeira players
Centers (basketball)
Cleveland Cavaliers players
Liga ACB players
Maccabi Kiryat Motzkin basketball players
Miami Heat players
KK Sloga players
National Basketball Association players from Serbia
Phoenix Suns draft picks
Power forwards (basketball)
Serbian men's basketball players
Serbian expatriate basketball people in Argentina
Serbian expatriate basketball people in Belgium
Serbian expatriate basketball people in Greece
Serbian expatriate basketball people in Israel
Serbian expatriate basketball people in Lithuania
Serbian expatriate basketball people in Poland
Serbian expatriate basketball people in Portugal
Serbian expatriate basketball people in Slovakia
Serbian expatriate basketball people in the United States
Sportspeople from Kraljevo
Tennessee Tech Golden Eagles men's basketball players